Michael Wawuyo Jr. (born 17 December 1986) is a Ugandan actor that started out as Brother John in Ugandan hit television series The Hostel (season 1) on NTV. His credits include also Beneath The Lies - The Series , Yat Madit, Kyenvu , Nsiwe, Girl in the yellow jumper and most recently sixteen rounds .

Early life
He is the son of actor and special effects director Wawuyo Michael . Wawuyo Jr attended Lohana Academy and Makerere College School. He played Jesus at Lohana Academy and while at Makerere College School he again played as Njoroge, from Ngugi wa Thiong’o and Ngugi wa Mirii’s play I Will Marry When I Want. He did information science at Uganda Christian University . He has previously appeared together with his father in The Right to Life, Stone Cold, and The Bullion.

Filmography

Television

Film

References

External links
 
Michael Wawuyo jr on Instagram

1989 births
Living people
Uganda Christian University alumni
Ugandan male film actors
21st-century Ugandan male actors
Ugandan male television actors
Ugandan television people
20th-century Ugandan male actors
African child actors
Male child actors
Ugandan male stage actors